The University of San Andrés is a private university located in Victoria, Buenos Aires, Argentina on the shores of the Rio de la Plata, in the metropolitan area of Greater Buenos Aires. It is a small institution, with approximately 900 undergraduate students and 500 graduate students.

It is served by one of the largest private libraries in the country, Max von Buch. Maintaining over 70,000 volumes, the library was recognized by the Andrew W. Mellon Foundation though their Program for Latin American Libraries and Archives. The university provides more than 70  study abroad programs with universities in Europe, North America, Latin America, and Australia. San Andrés is the first institution in Argentina to offer a double degree accredited by Grandes Ecoles ESCP-Europe.

The Universidad de San Andrés is one of the only two liberal arts colleges in Argentina, along with Universidad Torcuato Di Tella. The main campus is located in the town of Victoria, San Fernando Partido Universitykart (a northern suburb of Buenos Aires). It also has offices in downtown Buenos Aires.

History 
The university is a daughter institution of St. Andrew's Scots School, an institution founded by Scottish immigrants in 1838. It is named after Saint Andrew, the patron saint of Scotland, and its crest is composed of the Saltire (the flag of Scotland), and thistles (the national flower of Scotland).
The current institution was formally established on September 1, 1988, by the Scottish Civil Educational Association of San Andrés (ACEESA). This entity was superseded in 2010 by the University of San Andrés Foundation(FUdeSA).

The MBA programs taught by the university are accredited by the London-based Association of MBAs(AMBA).

Ranking
According to the QS World University Rankings, UdeSA is the fourth best private university in the country.

Courses offered

Undergraduate degrees 
The university offers undergraduate degrees in the following disciplines:

 Business Administration
 Political Science
 Education
 Communications
 Public Accounting
 Economics
 Humanities
 International Relations
 Marketing
 Human Resources
 Finances
 Law
 Design
Behavioural sciences

Graduate degree 

 Doctorate in Education
 Doctorate in Economics
 Doctorate in History
 Master's in Administration and Public Policy
 Master's in Business Administration
 Master's and Specialization in Business Law
 Master’s in Economics
 Master's and Specialization in Education
 Master's in Organizational Studies
 Master's in Historical Research and Postgraduate History Program
 Master's in Journalism
 Master's in International Relations and Negotiations
 Master's and Specialization in Finance
 Master's and Specialization in Technological Services and Telecommunications Management
 Master's in Marketing and Communication and Specialization in Marketing
 Specialization in Strategic Human Resources Management
 Specialization in Non-Profit Organizations (in association with Torcuato di Tella University and CEDES),
 Program in Human Factors and Organizations in Risk Management
 Program in Brazilian Culture

Specializations 

 Global Business Management
 Finance, Accounting and Management Control
 Marketing, Communication and Sales
 People Development and Management
 Real Estate
 Agribusiness and Food Industry
 Innovation and Entrepreneurship
 Social Innovation

Faculty
University of San Andrés has 596 academics, of which 76 are full-time researchers, divided in seven departments:
 Department of Administration
 Department of Social Sciences
 Department of Law
 Department of Economics
 Department of Humanities
 Department of Mathematics and Sciences
 School of Education 
Chairman members include:
Sebastián García-Dastugue. Ph.D. in Business Administration, Ohio State University. Roberto Bouzas. M.A. in Economics, Cambridge University. Lucas S. Grosman. Ph.D. in the Science of Law (JSD), Yale University. Federico Weinschelbaum. Ph.D. in Economics, University of California (Los Angeles). Eduardo Zimmermann. D. Phil in Modern History, University of Oxford. Ricardo Fraiman Maus. Doctor in Mathematic Sciences, Universidad de Buenos Aires. Jason Beech. Ph.D. in Education, University of London.

Foreign Studies 
The department of foreign studies offers students one of the most sought-after exchange programs in Argentina.
Programs Under Academic Agreements Include:

North America 
Canada: HEC Montréal, Schulich School of Business, York University, Université de Montréal, University of Guelph
United States of America: Harvard University, Annemberg School of Communication, University of Southern California, Rice University, Babson College, Columbia University, University of Kansas, New York University, University of Illinois, The College of New Jersey, University of Pennsylvania, The Wharton School of Business, University of Pittsburgh, University of Maryland, University of Miami, University of Washington, Kellogg School of Management

Europe 
United Kingdom: St. Antony's College, Oxford University, University of Bath, University of Edinburgh, University of Kent, University of Leeds, University of London, Regent's College, University College London, University of Westminster
France:ESCP-Europe, Institut d'études politiques de Paris, Montesquieu–Bordeaux IV, Université de Toulouse, Jean Moulin University Lyon 3
Spain: Universidad Autónoma de Madrid, Universidad de Deusto, Universidad de Las Palmas de Gran Canaria, Universitat de València, Universitat Pompeu Fabra
Italy: University of Bologna, Bocconi University
Germany: Frankfurt School of Financial Management, WHU- Otto Beisheim Graduate School of Management
Austria, Sweden, Russia, Czech Republic, Portugal, Belgium, Switzerland, Norway, and The Netherlands: FH Joaneum University of Applaied Sciences, Jönköping University, Saint-Petersburg State University, University of New York in Prague, Czech Republic, Universidade Nova de Lisboa, Université Libre de Bruxelles, University of St. Gallen, University of Oslo, Vrije Universiteit

Latin America 
Mexico: Centro de Investigación y Docencia –CIDE-, Universidad de las Américas, Instituto Tecnológico y de Estudios Superiores de Monterrey
Brazil: Desarrollo –Instituto de Capacitación y Estudios, Fundação Getulio Vargas, Escola de Administração de Empresas de São Paulo, Fundação Getulio Vargas, Universidade do Vale do Rio dos Sinos, Universidade Federal da Bahía, Universidade Federal de Rio Grande do Sul, Univeresidade Federale do Río de Janeiro, Brazil
Chile: Universidad de Desarrollo, Universidad Diego Portales,
Colombia, Ecuador, Paraguay, Uruguay: Universidad de los Andes, Desarrollo –Instituto de Capacitación y Estudios, Universidad Católica de Santiago de Guayaquil, Universidad de Montevideo, Universidad ORT

Australia 
Griffith University, Queensland, Carnegie Mellon

See also
 Scottish settlement in Argentina
 St. Andrew's Scots School

References

External links
  

San Andres
Educational institutions established in 1988
San Fernando de la Buena Vista
Universities in Buenos Aires Province
Victoria, Buenos Aires
1988 establishments in Argentina